Rainer Eitzinger was the champion in 2009, but he decided to not compete this year.Blaž Kavčič won the final against Michael Venus 7–6(6), 7–6(5).

Seeds

Draw

Finals

Top half

Bottom half

References
Main draw
Qualifying singles

2010 ATP Challenger Tour
2010 Singles